Sanny Monteiro (born 11 December 1989) is a Dutch footballer who plays as a right-back for Rijnsburgse Boys in the Dutch Tweede Divisie.

References

External links

1989 births
Living people
Dutch footballers
Association football fullbacks
Willem II (football club) players
TOP Oss players
VV Zwaluwen players
Kozakken Boys players
IJsselmeervogels players
Rijnsburgse Boys players
Eerste Divisie players
Tweede Divisie players
Footballers from Rotterdam